Xanthoparmelia malawiensis is a species of saxicolous (rock-dwelling), foliose lichen in the family Parmeliaceae. Found in Malawi, it was formally described as a new species in 2002 by Australian lichenologist John Elix. It is only known from the type locality. It contains usnic acid and stictic acid as major lichen products, and minor amounts of constictic acid, norstictic acid, cryptostictic acid, and lusitanic acid.

See also
List of Xanthoparmelia species

References

malawiensis
Lichen species
Lichens described in 2002
Lichens of Malawi
Taxa named by John Alan Elix